Scarab Peak is a prominent peak, 3,160 m, located 2 nautical miles (3.7 km) northeast of Mount Frustum in the southeast end of Tobin Mesa, the Mesa Range, Victoria Land. Named by the northern party of the New Zealand Geological Survey Antarctic Expedition (NZGSAE), 1962–63, for its resemblance to a scarab beetle.

Mountains of Victoria Land
Pennell Coast